The J. K. Wadley House is a historic house located at 618 Pecan Street in Texarkana, Arkansas.

Description and history 
Built in 1895, it is a two-story, wood-framed structure, and is notable as a fine local example of the Free Classical type of Queen Anne styling. It is also locally significant as being the longtime home of John Keener Wadley, a lumber, railroad, and oil baron listed as one of the wealthiest men in the United States. The house features a wraparound porch with a pedimented gable, supported by grouped columns. The exterior is finished in clapboarding on the lower level and decorative cut shingles on the upper level. A low onion-domed turret rises from the southern corner.

The house was listed on the National Register of Historic Places on February 12, 1999. It currently functions as a bed and breakfast.

See also
Augustus M. Garrison House, also part of the Wadley B&B, 600 Pecan Street
National Register of Historic Places listings in Miller County, Arkansas

References

External links
The Wadley House B&B
Airbnb Listing

Houses on the National Register of Historic Places in Arkansas
Queen Anne architecture in Arkansas
Houses completed in 1895
Houses in Miller County, Arkansas
National Register of Historic Places in Miller County, Arkansas
Buildings and structures in Texarkana, Arkansas